Jannie Sand (born 5 September 1980) is a Danish professional racing cyclist who rides for Team BMS BIRN.

See also
 List of 2016 UCI Women's Teams and riders

References

External links
 

1980 births
Living people
Danish female cyclists
Place of birth missing (living people)